= Lingankoppa =

- Village
- Country: India
- State: Karnataka
- District: Dharwad

Government
  - Type: Panchayat raj
  - Body: Gram panchayat

Area
  - Total: 13.0823 km^{2} (5.0511 sq mi)

Population (2011)
  - Total: 1,009
  - Density: 77.13/km^{2} (199.8/sq mi)

Languages
  - Official: Kannada
- Time zone: UTC+5:30 (IST)
- ISO 3166 code: IN-KA
- Vehicle registration: KA
- Website: karnataka.gov.in

Lingankoppa is a village in Dharwad district of Karnataka, India.

== Demographics ==
As of the 2011 Census of India there were 187 households in Lingankoppa and had a total population of 1,009 which consisted of 516 males and 493 females. There were 168 children ages 0-6.

== Area ==
The total geographical area of Lingankoppa village, located in Kalghatgi Taluka of Dharwad district in Karnataka, India, is approximately 1308.23 hectares. This area translates to about 13.0823 square kilometers.
